The Featherweight is an upcoming American biographical sports drama film directed by Robert Kolodny and starring James Madio as professional boxer Willie Pep.

Plot

Set in 1964, a camera crew follows Willie Pep, retired world featherweight boxing champion. Now living in Hartford Connecticut with an aspiring actress wife half his age, a drug-addled son, Italian immigrant parents, mounting debts and the feeling of faded glory… Pep decides to make a return to the ring.

Cast
James Madio as Willie Pep
Ruby Wolf as Linda Pep
Keir Gilchrist as Billy Papaleo Jr.
Stephen Lang as Bill Gore
Ron Livingston as Bob Kaplan
Lawrence Gilliard Jr. as Sandy Saddler
Shari Albert as Fran
Imma Aiello as "Mama" Papaleo
Michael Siberry as Bill Lee
David Gere

Production
Filming occurred in Hartford, Connecticut in November 2021.

References

External links
 

Upcoming films
American biographical drama films
American boxing films
American sports drama films
Appian Way Productions films
Biographical films about sportspeople
Films shot in Connecticut